Kyle Neptune (born January 21, 1985) is an American basketball coach who is the current head coach of the Villanova Wildcats men's basketball team.

Playing career
Neptune attended Brooklyn Friends School, and was a member of the school's 2003 State Championship team, recording a school record in points with 1,650. He played collegiate basketball at Lehigh under Billy Taylor where he was a member of the Mountain Hawks' 2004 NCAA tournament team.

Coaching career
Neptune's coaching career began in 2008 as a video coordinator under Jay Wright at Villanova and was on staff for the Wildcats' 2009 Final Four appearance. In 2010, he joined Joe Mihalich's staff at Niagara for three seasons before returning to Villanova as an assistant coach for eight seasons. During his time as an assistant coach, the Wildcats earned five Big East men's basketball tournament titles, as well as two national championships in 2016 and 2018.

On March 30, 2021, Neptune was named the head coach at Fordham, replacing Jeff Neubauer. Neptune would serve only one season at Fordham, as he was announced as Villanova's new head coach on April 20, 2022, following Wright's retirement.

On December 17, 2022, Neptune became the first Villanova men's basketball coach since Jack Kraft in 1962 to win a share of the Philadelphia Big 5 basketball title in his first year as coach of the program.  On December 21, 2022, Neptune won his first Big East Conference game with a 78–63 victory over St. John's.

Neptune joined Rollie Massimino as the two Villanova coaches to finish with a .500 or better conference record in his first season in the Big East. Neptune finished 10-10. Massimino was 8-6 in 1981. Jay Wright finished 7-9 in his first season, 2002. Steve Lappas finished 3-15 in his first season, 1993. 

He joined Rollie Massimino who defeated Providence College 68-49 on December 6, 1980, in his first Big East conference game, Steve Lappas who, on January 2, 1993, won on the road at 12th ranked Syracuse 79-61 in his first Big East conference game, and Hall of Famer Jay Wright who defeated Providence College 76-57 on January 2, 2002, in his first Big East conference game.

Gameday attire

Jay Wright retired in April 2022. Among the reasons stated by Wright was “burn out.” Prior to 2021, Wright was long considered one of the best dressed coaches in college basketball. However, beginning in the pandemic shortened 2020-2021 season, and into his season of burn out, Wright began to wear “athleisure wear” on the sidelines. This was controversial amongst the Villanova Community. When Neptune was hired, he was informed by Villanova University President, Father Peter M. Donohue, that he had to return to wearing a suit for games.  While coaching at Fordham, prior to being hired as head coach of Villanova, Neptune wore a suit as his gameday attire. The return of the suits was viewed as a positive within the Villanova community, including former Villanova national championship winning Center, Daniel Ochefu, who tweeted "Very tuff Nep!  Bring the suits back pls!"

Head coaching record

References

1985 births
Living people
American men's basketball players
Basketball coaches from New York (state)
Basketball players from New York City
College men's basketball head coaches in the United States
Fordham Rams men's basketball coaches
Lehigh Mountain Hawks men's basketball players
Niagara Purple Eagles men's basketball coaches
Sportspeople from Brooklyn
Villanova Wildcats men's basketball coaches